Bhanoor is a village located near Patancheru (8 km) in the Indian state of Telangana.
The village is noted for birth of prominent political figure  Late Shri Tangutoori Anjaiah who was elected CM of then united Andhra Pradesh. He is remembered for his ability to woo the Central govt to establish the coveted organization - Bharat Dynamics Limited.

It is an industrial location for central government establishments such as BDL and ODF. India’s MPATGM missile will be manufactured in this village. Lahari Resorts is within the premises. The nearest railway station is Shankarpally.

Recent developments:

 Rail coach project by Medha
 Aparna constructions project
 South India’s biggest railway junction coming up.

References

Villages in Medak district